The 1992 Tercera División play-offs to Segunda División B from Tercera División (Promotion play-offs) were the final playoffs for the promotion from 1991–92 Tercera División to 1992–93 Segunda División B. The first four teams of each group (excluding reserve teams) took part in the play-off.

Group A-1

Promotion to Segunda 'B':  Aranjuez

Group A-2

Promotion to  Segunda 'B':  Racing Ferrol

Group A-3

Promotion to Segunda 'B':  Celta Turista

Group A-4

Promotion to Segunda 'B': RSD Alcalá

Group B-1

Promotion to Segunda 'B':  Elgóibar

Group B-2

Promotion to Segunda 'B':  Beasaín

Group B-3

Promotion to Segunda 'B':  Endesa Andorra

Group B-4

Promotion to Segunda 'B':  Izarra

Group C-1

Promotion to Segunda 'B'  Valencia B

Group C-2

Promotion to Segunda 'B':  Lliria

Group C-3

Promotion to Segunda 'B'  Horadada

Group C-4

Promotion to Segunda 'B'  Ibiza

Group D-1

Promotion to Segunda 'B':  San Roque

Group D-2

Promotion to Segunda 'B'  Écija

Group D-3

Promotion to Segunda 'B'  Toledo

Group D-4

Promotion to Segunda 'B': Sevilla B
CD Málaga was dissolved and Cacereño was promoted to Segunda B

Group E

Promotion to Segunda 'B' : Mensajero

See also
1991–92 Tercera División

External links
Futbolme.com

play
Tercera División play-offs
2